San Ramón  is a district in the canton of San Ramón in  Alajuela Province in Costa Rica. However, cities are no longer a valid administrative division in Costa Rica, by municipal codex law 7794 of April 30, 1998.

While retaining its rich heritage and tradition, San Ramón continues to serve as a link between the agricultural communities farther north in the Meseta Central and the central cities of San Jose, Alajuela, Heredia, and Cartago.

History
San Ramón's history begins with the arrival of the European settlers in this part of the central valley in the early 1840s. These primary colonizers established traditional farms in the area, many of which are either still operational or have since been converted to the cultivation of the region's three main export crops: Tropical ornamentals, sugar cane, and coffee. The name San Ramón was bestowed by two prominent figures in the establishment of the town, Ramon Salas (1838-1902) and Ramon Rodriguez (1818-1893) who placed the area under the protection of Saint Raymond Nonnatus. In 1854 the village of San Ramón was elevated in status to municipality then, in 1856, five schools were funded which was the beginning of the Municipality of San Ramón's legacy as the main educational, and later commercial, hub of the canton. San Ramon holds a rich tradition and is home to great poets (Lisimaco Chavarria) and former presidents (Jose Figueres Ferrer). Its story dates from the nineteenth century and holds events to mark one or another so the fate of the entire country, for example the creation of "Liberacion Nacional Party" and the Army eradication by the hand of expresident "Don Pepe Figueres". Since 1876 San Ramón has also served as the governmental center of Alajuela Province's second largest district which is also named San Ramón.

Location

San Ramon is located 55 kilometers northeast of Puntarenas on the Gulf of Nicoya, 44 kilometers northwest of the provincial capital city of Alajuela and 58 kilometers from the national capital city of San Jose.

The plaza is located 47 km WNW of Costa Rica's parliament building in the center of the capital city of San José and 31 km from Juan Santamaría International Airport in Alajuela. Its location in the central valley (Meseta Central) is c.33 km east of the Pacific coast near Puntarenas, and c.140 km west of the Caribbean at a point north of Limón. One route runs out of the north of town directly to the popular Costa Rican destination of Volcan Arenal, and the Pan-American Highway runs just south of the city's southern edge granting easy access to all other north-south points in the country, as well as linking San Ramón to the Americas.

Geography 
San Ramón has an area of 1.28 km² and an elevation of 1057 metres.

Climate
Despite the tropical latitude of San Ramón, temperatures tend to be warm rather than hot year-round: . June through October is considered the rainy or "green" season with November to May considered the "dry season." Diurnal periods are very predictable due to Costa Rica's latitude: The sun rises in San Ramon by about 05:45 and sets at 18:30 with very little variation throughout the year.
This regular cycle is further evident in the precipitation patterns, particularly during the rainy season. As the morning sun rises, air which is already moist due to a certain amount of orographic lift being added by the Pacific Ocean, is further loaded by evapotranspiration wherein water drawn from the ground by plants and trees is transpired into the atmosphere. This leads to a relatively consistent pattern of mostly dry mornings followed by rains in the afternoon, usually beginning around 14:00. Rains can last for a short period, or for several hours, and there is a seemingly equal chance that there will either be a downpour or a drizzle. Evenings can be cooler than one might expect due to altitude, and cooler still in the evenings following rain. At the highest elevations, temperatures down to  have been recorded.

Demographics 

For the 2011 census, San Ramón had a population of  inhabitants.

Transportation

Road transportation 
The district is covered by the following road routes:
 National Route 135
 National Route 169
 National Route 702
 National Route 703
 National Route 705
 National Route 742

See also
 Alberto Manuel Brenes Biological Reserve

References

External links
 Timeline history of San Ramon, Historical citations
 Municipality of San Ramón, official website
 Museum of San Ramón, University of Costa Rica
 Palmares and San Ramon, Palmares y San Ramon

Districts of Alajuela Province